Kaula may refer to:

People
 Prithvi Nath Kaula (1924–2009), Indian librarian
 William J. Kaula (1871–1953), American watercolor painter
 William M. Kaula (1926–2000), Australian-born American geophysicist

Other uses
 USS Kaula (AG-33), 1938 military cargo ship in the Pacific
 Kaulaʻināiwi Island, Hawaii, U.S.
 Kaʻula, a Hawaiian island, U.S.
 Kaula (Hinduism), a religious tradition
 Kaula (month), the twelfth month in the Nepal Era calendar

See also 
 Caula (disambiguation)
 Kaul, a surname that derives from Kaula